Sung-won, also spelled Seong-won, is a Korean unisex given name. Its meaning differs based on the hanja used to write each syllable of the name. There are 27 hanja with the reading "sung" and 35 hanja with the reading "won" on the South Korean government's official list of hanja which may be used in given names.

People with this name include:
Yu Seong-won (died 1456), Joseon Dynasty scholar-official
Hong Sung-won (born 1937), South Korean writer
Sung Won Sohn (born 1944), South Korean-born American economist
Oh Sung-won (born 1972), South Korean musical theatre actor
Choi Sung-won (billiards player) (born 1977), South Korean billiards player
Hwang Geum-hee (born 1977), South Korean actress formerly known by the stage name Ji Sung-won 
Choi Sung-won (actor) (born 1985), South Korean actor
SungWon Cho (born 1990), Korean-American actor, voice actor, sketch comedian, and YouTuber
Sung-Won Yang, 21st-century South Korean cellist

See also
List of Korean given names

References

Korean unisex given names